Panther Branch Township (also designated Township 15) is one of twenty townships within Wake County, North Carolina, United States. At the 2010 census, Panther Branch Township had a population of 24,019, a 61.8% increase over 2000.

Panther Branch Township, occupying  in southern Wake County, includes small portions of the town of Garner.

References

Townships in Wake County, North Carolina
Townships in North Carolina